The women's 20 kilometres walk at the 2010 European Athletics Championships was held on the streets of Barcelona on 28 July.

Medalists

Records

Schedule

Results

Final

References

 Results

Walk 20 km
Racewalking at the European Athletics Championships
2010 in women's athletics